Richard Patrick Noble (3 May 1915 – 17 December 1977) was an Australian rules footballer who played with Fitzroy in the Victorian Football League (VFL).

Notes

External links 

1915 births
1977 deaths
Australian rules footballers from Melbourne
Fitzroy Football Club players
People from Fitzroy, Victoria